Lee Jin-Hyung (born 22 February 1988) is a South Korean footballer who plays as goalkeeper.

Career
He was selected by Jeju United in 2010 K League Draft.

References

External links 

1988 births
Living people
Association football goalkeepers
South Korean footballers
Jeju United FC players
FC Anyang players
Ansan Mugunghwa FC players
Incheon United FC players
Gwangju FC players
K League 1 players
K League 2 players